Ben Moreell (1892–1978) was a 20th-century USN admiral.

Ben Moreell may also refer to: Ben Moreell (steamer), a Great Lakes vessel, that collided with and sunk the ferry Ashtabula